Catherine Murphy Urner Shatto (23 March 1891 – 30 April 1942) was an American composer.

Life
Catherine Murphy Urner was born in Mitchell, Indiana, the third of seven children of Southern Illinois Normal College principal Edward Everett Urner (later a Methodist minister) and writer Jessie Robertson Urner. She studied piano, voice and composition at Goucher College in Baltimore, Maryland, Peabody Conservatory and Miami University in Oxford, Ohio, graduating with a Bachelor of Arts degree in 1912. She continued her studies at the University of California at Berkeley where she was the first to win the George Ladd Prix de Paris for composition in 1918 and was awarded the chance to move to Paris to study with Charles Koechlin from 1919 to 1921. She returned to Paris intermittently during the period from 1923–1926 to resume composition studies with Koechlin as well as vocal study with Mademoiselle Andree d'Otemar.

Urner worked as a professor and director of vocal music at Mills College in Oakland, California from 1921 to 1924. After leaving Mills College, she devoted her time to performing, composing and touring in the U.S. and Europe with the assistance of Charles Koechlin. She also collected Native American tribal melodies which she incorporated into her compositions. Her first string quartet premiered in 1925 at Salle Pleyel in Paris, by the Krettly Quartet with 17-year-old cellist, Pierre Fournier.  The program also included vocal renditions of compositions by Koechlin, Debussy, Brahms, Shubert and songs she had composed. She arranged for Koechlin to teach a course at the University of California in 1928, and afterward lived with Koechlin in Paris until 1933, collaborating on a number of works. Their musical collaboration was also one of intimacy and deep admiration. In 1937 she returned to California and married organist and composer Charles Rollins Shatto (1908–1983). 

She died in San Diego, and her papers are housed at the University of California at Berkeley Jean Gray Hargrove Music Library.

Works
Her archived works include over eighty songs, a number of Native American songs, twenty-four choral works and eight orchestral works. Selected compositions include:
The Bride of a God with Charles Koechlin
Come Away, Death
Song of the Sea
Song from "April"
Le Papillon
Quatre Melodies, collection of songs
Ici-bas
Colloque Sentimental

References

1891 births
1942 deaths
20th-century classical composers
American women classical composers
American classical composers
Miami University alumni
Goucher College alumni
Peabody Institute alumni
University of California, Berkeley alumni
Mills College faculty
People from Mitchell, Indiana
Musicians from Indiana
20th-century American women musicians
20th-century American composers
20th-century women composers
American women academics